Tortilia trigonella is a species of moth in the family Stathmopodidae. It is found in Morocco south-west of Marrakesch, in the High Atlas near Goundafa and in Middle Atlas near Azrou.

The wingspan is about 9 mm. Adults have been recorded in June.

References

Stathmopodidae
Endemic fauna of Morocco
Moths described in 1935
Moths of Africa